A fellow is a member of a group of learned people.

Fellow may also refer to:

 Fellow (emulator), an emulator designed to run Amiga software
 Fellow, a commonly used synonym for man
 The Fellow, a racehorse

See also
 Fella (disambiguation)
 Feller (disambiguation)